The Mercator is a series of combine harvesters produced by the German agricultural company Claas in Harsewinkel. Initially called Senator, the Mercator series was introduced in 1966. The first combine harvester of the series to be called Mercator was presented in 1967, the Protector followed in 1968. Both are less productive but also less expensive models. With the Facelift, the Senator was renamed Mercator 70, while the Protector models were given the names Mercator 60 and 50. Later, more models of the Mercator series were introduced, such as the Mercator 75.

The Senator is the first Claas combine harvester to feature the colour saatengrün (German: seed-green), the new Claas-logo and extensive metal covers.

Technical data

References 

Claas
Combine harvesters